John Hughes (born 1961) is a Sydney-based Australian writer and retired teacher. His first book of autobiographical essays, The Idea of Home, published by Giramondo in 2004, was widely acclaimed and won both the New South Wales Premier's Literary Awards for Non-Fiction (2005) and the National Biography Award (2006). In 2022, Hughes faced accusations of plagiarism in his 2021 book The Dogs.

Biography
Hughes was born in Cessnock, New South Wales to a father of Welsh descent and a mother who was of Ukrainian descent. Hughes wrote that as a second generation Australian, he "lived in two worlds as a child": one world the routine, real world of Cessnock and the second the exotic foreign world of his European family's past.  The sense that he was 'foreign' became central to his sense of self. He felt connected to an imagined past of his grandparents.  As a child stories were told to him of how his grandparents fled Kiev during the Second World War and had walked on foot across Europe to Naples. From Naples, they emigrated to Australia. The text in "The Idea of Home" is devoted to the stories of this journey passed down from Hughes' grandfather, and their impact on a young John Hughes.

Hughes undertook a medical degree, but shortly realised it was not for him. He switched to an undergraduate arts degree at Newcastle University in the late 1970s, and at the end of his Honours year, was offered the Shell Scholarship to Cambridge. His preconceived notions of Europe as a place vastly more sophisticated than his provincial Cessnock prompted him to go. However, as he spent more time in England, and struggled through a PhD on Coleridge, he realised that his ideas were wrong, and that provincialism was, if not as obvious, certainly still as potent in what was considered the centre of the academic world. After this, he gave up his "life of letters", as he called it, and returned to Australia.

Back in Sydney, he unsuccessfully tried to teach at his old university, Newcastle, but his failure at Cambridge haunted him. He did, however, complete a PhD thesis at UTS, called "Memory and Forgetting". In 1995, Hughes took a position in the English Department of Sydney Grammar School,  where he is Senior Master in English and Senior Librarian. He runs Sydney Grammar's Creative Writing Group and Extension Two English at the school. As well as his interest in longer forms, Hughes has been published in HEAT Magazine, edited by Ivor Indyk.

Plagiarism controversy 
Hughes was accused of plagiarising significant sections of his 2021 book The Dogs by The Guardian.  Guardian Australia identified close to 60 similarities between Hughes' book and The Unwomanly Face of War by Svetlana Alexievich. Hughes admitted the plagiarism, although he said it was unintentional.

Hughes acknowledged he had unwittingly copied large sections of Svetlana Alexievich's nonfiction book The Unwomanly Face of War.  His publisher Upswell Publishing initially stood by his claims that he had forgotten his original source material because he had "never written a book like The Dogs before that has taken so many different forms over so many years".  Alexievich said that such actions were "outrageous" and her translators have similarly expressed their disbelief at the claim that the plagiarism was unintentional.  Her translators said "Such things don't happen by coincidence: not with such specific words, sequences, voicing," and said the incident deserved public attention and reproach. 

Further investigations found that other parts of Hughes' novel copied classic texts including The Great Gatsby, Anna Karenina, and All Quiet on the Western Front. 

Hughes said: "I don't think I am a plagiarist more than any other writer who has been influenced by the greats who have come before them...This new material has led me to reflect on my process as a writer. I've always used the work of other writers in my own. It's a rare writer who doesn't ... It's a question of degree. As T.S. Eliot wrote in The Sacred Wood, 'Immature poets imitate; mature poets steal; bad poets deface what they take, and good poets make it into something better, or at least something different.' That great centrepiece of modernism, The Wasteland, is itself a kind of anthology of the great words of others. Does this make Eliot a plagiarist? Not at all, it seems. You take, that is, and make something else out of it; you make it your own.”

Hughes' publisher Terri-ann White at Upswell had initially stood by his claims of an accidental mistake, but distanced herself from Hughes after the new findings.  She stated, "When I read the manuscript of The Dogs, I was instantly attracted to the character of Michael Shamanov, a dissolute and very flawed middle-aged man dealing with his aged mother who wanted her life to end. Although I have read most of the books now revealed as being quoted without attribution in The Dogs, I sincerely did not recognise them folded into a new text. That's a trust thing, I think. They formed part of this narrative; I don’t have the kind of mind that can sift through the strands of a long novel to hear discord. Besides, it is a book about discord and discomfort between people. (In literary publishing we do not use software tools to track plagiarism.)  I was affronted when John Hughes wrote, in his rejoinder in The Guardian yesterday: I wanted the appropriated passages to be seen and recognised as in a collage."

In response to this statement, Hughes apologised and said that "In my piece on influences I never intended to imply that I had knowingly passed off other writers words as my own," Hughes said. "I sought only to try to clarify as far as I am able how something like this might happen to a fiction writer."

The novel was subsequently removed form the Miles Franklin Award long list.

Works

The Idea of Home
This autobiographical novel was written over a ten-year period. It is a collection of five interlinked essays where Hughes describes his relationship with the Ukrainian heritage of his mother and grandfather and his childhood experience of growing up as a second generation Australian. The essays are also about how the idea of Europe he developed as a young man clashed with the reality he found in Cambridge and when he travelled though Europe.

The Remnants
A manuscript written by an Australian art historian is discovered by his son. Claiming to have found a series of lost paintings by Piero della Francesca in Arezzo, the father's manuscript moves between Renaissance Italy and post-Revolutionary Russia – at its core is the relationship the father has with an ageing Russian émigrée who, haunted by the ghost of her murdered son, claims to have nursed the poet Osip Mandelstam in his final days. The remnants of the father's manuscripts, notebooks and diaries are brought together through the son's commentary resulting in a deeply philosophical novel about translation between languages, cultures and, ultimately, the translation of the father into the son.

The Dogs 
Michael Shamanov is a man running away from life's responsibilities. His marriage is over, he barely sees his son and he has not seen his mother since banishing her to a nursing home two years earlier. A successful screen writer, Michael's encounter with his mother’s nurse leads him to discover that the greatest story he has never heard may lie with his dying mother.

The book was  shortlisted for the Victorian and New South Wales Premier’s Literary Prizes, and the Miles Franklin Award in 2022. It was withdrawn from competition due to findings of plagiarism.

Awards
 2005 – New South Wales Premier's Literary Awards Douglas Stewart Prize for Non-Fiction for The Idea of Home: Autobiographical Essays
 2005 – shortlisted for the New South Wales Premier's Literary Awards Community Relations Commission Award for  The Idea of Home: Autobiographical Essays
 2006 – National Biography Award for The Idea of Home: Autobiographical Essays
 2006 – inducted into the City of Cessnock Hall of Fame
 2008 – Queensland Premier's Literary Awards, Australian Short Story Collection – Arts Queensland Steele Rudd Award for Someone Else
2020 – shortlisted Miles Franklin Award for No One
2022 – shortlisted for Victorian Premier's Prize for Fiction for The Dogs
2022 – shortlisted for New South Wales Premier's Literary Awards Christina Stead Prize for Fiction for The Dogs
2022 - longlisted  Miles Franklin Award  for The Dogs. [Withdrawn]

Bibliography

Books
The Idea of Home: Autobiographical Essays (Giramondo, 2004) 
Someone else: fictional essays (Giramondo Pub. for the Writing & Society Research Group at the University of Western Sydney, 2007) 
The Remnants (UWA Publishing, 2012) 
The Garden of Sorrows (UWA Publishing, 2013) 
Asylum (UWA Publishing, 2016) 
No One (UWA Publishing, 2019) 
The Dogs (Upswell, 2021)

Journal Articles

Plays
 Untitled:A Play in Three Acts, written and directed by John Hughes: performed at the Asian Music and Dance Festival at the Studio at Sydney Opera House in 2002SMH Review (19 August 2002)

Notes

References
 Ten-year walk down memory lane brings home the bacon, By Angela Bennie (24 May 2005) Sydney Morning Herald (retrieved 15 August 2007)
 The Idea of Home, reviewed by Mark Mordue (4 December 2004) Sydney Morning Herald (retrieved 15 August 2007)
 John Hughes – The Idea of Home: Autobiographical Essays  Radio National, Australia Talks Books (Retrieved 15 August 2007)
 Memory and Home by John Hughes Keynote Address presented at the Perth Day of Ideas, Institute of Advance Studies, University of WA in September 2006 (Retrieved 14 August 2007)

1961 births
Australian memoirists
Living people
Australian schoolteachers
University of Newcastle (Australia) alumni
University of Technology Sydney alumni
People from the Hunter Region
